Jamaat Ul-Furquan is an Islamist splinter group of Khuddam ul-Islam banned under United Kingdom terrorism legislation.

References

Organisations designated as terrorist by the United Kingdom